William Randolph Carpenter (April 24, 1894 in Marion, Kansas – July 26, 1956 in Topeka, Kansas) was a U.S. Representative from Kansas and a U.S. Army World War I veteran. He died in Topeka, Kansas, July 26, 1956 and was interred in Highland Cemetery, Marion, Kansas.

Biography
Carpenter attended local public and high schools in Marion, Kansas. He graduated from the law department of the University of Michigan at Ann Arbor in 1917, where he was a member of the Chi Phi Fraternity. He was admitted to the bar that same year and commenced his practice in Marion, Kansas. He continued his family's agricultural pursuits by maintaining his farm.

World War I
He joined the U. S. Army National Guard in Marion in 1917 as a Second Lieutenant and helped organize Company M under the Third Regiment Infantry, Kansas National Guard. During the First World War he was called to active duty and was transferred to Company M, One Hundred Thirty-ninth Infantry Regiment, Thirty-fifth Infantry Division which deployed to France in early 1918. He was promoted to first lieutenant during the Argonne offensive, and served until his discharge on May 8, 1919.

Marriage
He married Helen Frances Williams (born 20 November 1896 in Marion, Kansas - died January 1994 in Topeka, Kansas) daughter of Fred Reed & Frances Elizabeth (née Skidmore) Williams on 15 July 1920 in Marion, Kansas.

Community service
 He served as member of the Marion Board of Education 1925–1933.
 He served in the State house of representatives 1929–1933.
 Carpenter was elected as a Democrat to the Seventy-third and Seventy-fourth Congresses (March 4, 1933–January 3, 1937). He was not a candidate for renomination in 1936 and he resumed the practice of law.
 He was the United States attorney for the district of Kansas 1945–1948.
 He was an unsuccessful Democratic candidate for governor in 1948.
 He served as member of the United States Motor Carrier Claims Commission 1950–1952.

References

1894 births
1956 deaths
People from Marion, Kansas
American Protestants
Democratic Party members of the Kansas House of Representatives
United States Army officers
United States Attorneys for the District of Kansas
University of Michigan Law School alumni
Democratic Party members of the United States House of Representatives from Kansas
20th-century American politicians